A Wise Fool is a 1921 American silent drama film produced by Famous Players-Lasky and released by Paramount Pictures. This film is based on the novel The Money Master by Sir Gilbert Parker and was directed by George Melford. James Kirkwood is the star of the film. A copy is held at the Library of Congress.

Plot
Based upon a description in a film publication, Jean Jacques Barbille (Kirkwood), a wealthy egoist and philosopher in the small parish of Quebec, returns from Paris with Carmen Dolores (Hollister), a Spanish girl, as his wife. When their daughter Zoe (Forrest) is grown, Carmen realizes that her husband neglects her, and finally leaves him. When Jean objects to her marriage, Zoe goes west with her lover. Then Jean's mill burns down, and his money is stolen. After long wanderings Jean comes upon his wife, who is ill in a convent. There is a reconciliation and then his daughter, who had been searching for Jean, and her husband arrive.

Cast

References

External links

Promotional still of Ann Forrest at silenthollywood.com

1921 films
1921 drama films
Silent American drama films
American silent feature films
American black-and-white films
Famous Players-Lasky films
Films based on Canadian novels
Films based on works by Gilbert Parker
Films directed by George Melford
Films shot in California
Paramount Pictures films
1920s American films
Surviving American silent films